Sebastiani Vineyards  is owned by  Foley Wine Group of Los Olivos, California, which also owns  Firestone Vineyards in Santa Barbara County, Merus in Napa, and Three Rivers Winery in Washington. 
Sebastiani produces 280,000 cases a year.

History
Samuele Sebastiani, a laborer, came to America from Tuscany and began making wine in Sonoma in 1904. Samuele Sebastiani built the business from one 501-gallon redwood vat to an  operation of millions of bottles per year with multiple varietals. 
His grandchildren could not agree on the future of the business and sold in 2008.

References

California wine